Guanine nucleotide-binding protein G(q) subunit alpha is a protein that in humans is encoded by the GNAQ gene. Together with GNA11 (its paralogue), it functions as a Gq alpha subunit.

Function 

Guanine nucleotide-binding proteins are a family of heterotrimeric proteins that couple cell surface, 7-transmembrane domain receptors to intracellular signaling pathways. Receptor activation catalyzes the exchange of GDP for GTP bound to the inactive G protein alpha subunit resulting in a conformational change and dissociation of the complex. The G protein alpha and beta-gamma subunits are capable of regulating various cellular effectors. Activation is terminated by a GTPase intrinsic to the G-alpha subunit. G-alpha-q is the alpha subunit of one of the heterotrimeric GTP-binding proteins that mediates stimulation of phospholipase C-beta (MIM 600230).[supplied by OMIM]

Mutations in this gene have been found associated to cases of Sturge–Weber syndrome and port-wine stains.

Interactions 

GNAQ has been shown to interact with:
 Beta adrenergic receptor kinase, 
 Bruton's tyrosine kinase,
 RGS16
 RGS4 
 RIC8A,  and
 Sodium-hydrogen antiporter 3 regulator 1.

See also 
 List of genes mutated in pigmented cutaneous lesions

References

Further reading